Vanier may refer to:

People
Jean Vanier (1928–2019), Canadian founder of L'Arche
Jeannine Vanier (born 1929), blind Canadian composer and organist
Nicolas Vanier (born 1962), French documentary filmmaker
Georges Vanier (1888–1967), former Governor General of Canada
Pauline Vanier (1898–1991), Canadian humanitarian

Places
Vanier, Ontario, Canada
Vanier, Quebec City, Canada
Vanier Park, Vancouver, British Columbia, Canada

Other
Vanier Institute of the Family, Canada 
Vanier College in Saint-Laurent, Montreal, Quebec, Canada
Vanier Cup, Canadian Interuniversity Sport Canadian football trophy
Vanier (electoral district), a Quebec provincial electoral district, Canada
Vanier Canada Graduate Scholarships
8604 Vanier, an asteroid named in honour of Jean Vanier